Melbourne House may refer to:

 Melbourne House, a building on Piccadilly, London, which is now the Albany
 Melbourne House (company), a software publisher now known as Krome Studios Melbourne
 Melbourne House, an Electronic dance music genre, also known as Melbourne Bounce